Hix is an unincorporated community in Summers County, West Virginia, United States.  It lies to the northeast of the city of Hinton, the county seat of Summers County. Its elevation is 2,618 feet (798 m).  At some point, Hix possessed a post office, which closed on December 6, 1975.

References

Unincorporated communities in Summers County, West Virginia
Unincorporated communities in West Virginia